John Anckers was an Anglican priest in Ireland during the seventeenth century.

Anckers was educated at Trinity College, Dublin. After a curacy at Drumrany he held incumbencies at Ballyloghloe and Athlone. He was appointed Archdeacon of Clonmacnoise  in 1620.

References

Alumni of Trinity College Dublin
17th-century Irish Anglican priests
Archdeacons of Clonmacnoise